The 16th Pennsylvania House of Representatives District is in southwest Pennsylvania and has been represented by Robert Matzie since 2009.

District profile
The 16th District is located in Beaver County and includes the following areas:

 Aliquippa
 Ambridge
 Baden
Center Township
 Conway
 East Rochester
 Freedom
 Harmony Township
 Hopewell Township
 Monaca
 Rochester
Rochester Township
 South Heights

Representatives

Recent election results

References

External links
District map from the United States Census Bureau
Pennsylvania House Legislative District Maps from the Pennsylvania Redistricting Commission.  
Population Data for District 16 from the Pennsylvania Redistricting Commission.

Government of Allegheny County, Pennsylvania
Government of Beaver County, Pennsylvania
16